Naveen Kumar is an Indian football player who plays as a goalkeeper  for Indian Super League team FC Goa.

Club career

2003
U 17 As Goalkeeper Punjab State team
State games held at Andaman and Nicobar

2008–2010
He received Best Goalkeeper award in Punjab League.

Pailan Arrows

2011–12
Naveen Kumar started the 2011–12 football season during the 2011 Indian Federation Cup with I-League team Pailan Arrows (Indian arrows) He played in all of Pailan's three matches in the tournament. In 2011 he also played for U-23 India national team.

Mohun Bagan
For 2012–13 season he was signed by Mohun Bagan A.C.

Lone Star F.C. (Kashmir F.C.)
In 2014 Naveen signed with Kashmir F.C.

Salgaocar F.C. 
Naveen Kumar returned to I-league with Salgaocar F.C. in August 2015.

Kerala Blasters

In January 2019, After 5 games with Kerala Blasters, he come back to FC Goa on loan.

Career statistics
Last updated December 29, 2011

Honours

Club 
FC Goa
Indian Super Cup: 2019
 Indian Super League Premiers: 2019–20
 Durand Cup: 2021

References

External links
 

1989 births
Living people
Indian footballers
Footballers from Hoshiarpur
I-League players
Indian Arrows players
Mohun Bagan AC players
Association football goalkeepers
Indian Super League players
FC Goa players
Kerala Blasters FC players
Lonestar Kashmir F.C. players
Salgaocar FC players
Churchill Brothers FC Goa players